Kravinsky is a surname. Notable people with the surname include:

 Liza Figueroa Kravinsky (born 1962), American composer, filmmaker, and actress
 Zell Kravinsky, American investor and utilitarian

See also
 Krasiński